Castle of Riddles is a text adventure released by Acornsoft for the BBC Micro (in 1982) and Acorn Electron (1984) home computers. The game was written by Peter Killworth and was one of a series of text adventures written for, or ported to the BBC Micro by the same author (others including Countdown to Doom and Philosopher's Quest). As with all such games, only text is used. The player must use a simple 'verb-noun' format (e.g. 'Go North', 'Get lamp') to control the game. Unlike Killworth's other Acornsoft adventures, Castle of Riddles was not updated and reissued by Topologika so became unavailable after 1985 when Acorn Computers (parent company of Acornsoft) pulled out of the games publishing market. Some of the puzzles however were included in the Topologika version of Philosopher's Quest.

Plot

The player takes the role of a 'professional adventurer' who is 'down to his last silver piece'. His services are hired by a wizard whose castle has been taken over by a warlock. The warlock has also found the wizard's Magic Ring of Power which must be returned. The player must navigate the castle, solve problems and avoid booby traps set by the warlock in order to recover the magic ring for the wizard. The adventurer must also search for treasure and deposit it in a safe which he can then keep as payment.

Gameplay
Points are awarded for picking up treasure and again for depositing it in the safe as well as completing certain tasks. The maximum possible score is 250.

References

External Links 
 

1980s interactive fiction
1983 video games
Acornsoft games
BBC Micro and Acorn Electron games
BBC Micro and Acorn Electron-only games
Europe-exclusive video games
Video games developed in the United Kingdom
Single-player video games